The One was a six-issue comic book limited series distributed by Epic Comics in 1985–1986. It was written and drawn by Rick Veitch.

It is an ambitious and bizarre fantasy-adventure involving monstrous superheroes, the Cold War, and spiritual evolution.

Collected editions
Veitch's own King Hell Press reprinted the series in a trade paperback:
 The One: The Last Word in Superheroics (192 pages, November 2003)

References

1985 comics debuts
1986 comics endings
Fantasy comics
Adventure comics